Eurysacca parvula is a moth in the family Gelechiidae. It was described by Povolný in 1986. It is found in Argentina.

References

Eurysacca
Moths described in 1986